Pavetta is a genus of flowering plants in the family Rubiaceae. It comprises about 360 species of trees, evergreen shrubs and sub-shrubs. It is found in woodlands, grasslands and thickets in sub-tropical and tropical Africa and Asia. The plants are cultivated for their simple but variable leaves, usually opposite but also occur in triple whorls. The leaves are often membranous with dark bacterial nodules. Pavetta has small, white, tubular flowers, sometimes salviform or funnel-shaped with 4 spreading petal lobes. The flowers are carried on terminal corymbs or cymes.

Gousiekte
Two Pavetta species, Pavetta harborii and Pavetta schummaniana, harbor endophytic Burkholderia bacteria in visible leaf nodules and are known to cause gousiekte, a cardiotoxicosis of ruminants characterised by heart failure four to eight weeks after ingestion of certain rubiaceous plants.

Species

Selected species include:

 Pavetta axillipara 
 Pavetta blanda 
 Pavetta brachycalyx 
 Pavetta capensis 
 Pavetta gleniei 
 Pavetta holstii 
 Pavetta indica 
 Pavetta intermedia 
 Pavetta kimberleyana 
 Pavetta kupensis 
 Pavetta lasioclada 
 Pavetta linearifolia 
 Pavetta lynesii 
 Pavetta manyanguensis 
 Pavetta mollissima 
 Pavetta monticola 
 Pavetta muiriana 
 Pavetta nitidissima 
 Pavetta rubentifolia 
 Pavetta schumanniana 
 Pavetta sparsipila 
 Pavetta tarennoides

Pictures

References

External links

 World Checklist of Rubiaceae

 
Rubiaceae genera
Taxa named by Carl Linnaeus
Taxonomy articles created by Polbot